Guttormsen is a Norwegian surname meaning "son of Guttorm". Notable people with the surname include:

Finn Guttormsen (born 1968), Norwegian jazz musician
Guttorm Guttormsen (born 1950), Norwegian jazz musician
Oscar Guttormsen (1884–1964), Norwegian athlete
Per Willy Guttormsen (born 1942), Norwegian speed skater
Sondre Guttormsen (born 1999), Norwegian pole vaulter 
Thorsten Guttormsen Fretheim (1808–?), Norwegian politician
Ulf Guttormsen (born 1942), Norwegian politician

Norwegian-language surnames